The Iowa Hawkeyes baseball team was a baseball team that represented the University of Iowa in the 2022 NCAA Division I baseball season. The Hawkeyes were members of the Big Ten Conference and played their home games at Duane Banks Field in Iowa City, Iowa. They were led by ninth-year head coach Rick Heller.

Previous season
The Hawkeyes finished the 2021 NCAA Division I baseball season 26–18 overall (26–18 conference) and tied for fourth place in conference standings, as the season was limited to only conference games for all Big Ten teams due to the COVID-19 pandemic.

Preseason
Hitting coach Jimmy Frankos was not retained by the team, and he was replaced by North Dakota State hitting coach, David Pearson.

For the 2022 Big Ten Conference poll, Iowa was voted to third in first by the Big Ten Coaches.

Roster

Schedule

! style="" | Regular Season
|- valign="top"

|- align="center" bgcolor="#ccffcc"
| 1 || February 18 || vs  || Wando River Field • Charleston, South Carolina || 12–2 || Mazur (1–0) || Skenes (0–1) || None || 120 || 1–0 || –
|- align="center" bgcolor="#ccffcc"
| 2 || February 19 || vs Ball State || Detyens Field • Charleston, South Carolina || 11–1 || Brecht (1–0) || Schweitzer (0–1) || None || 132 || 2–0 || –
|- align="center" bgcolor="#ccffcc"
| 3 || February 20 || vs  || Detyens Field • Charleston, South Carolina || 3–0 || Langenberg (1–0) || Odell (0–1) || Nedved (1) || 97 || 3–0 || –
|- align="center" bgcolor="#ccffcc"
| 4 || February 25 || vs  || Whataburger Field • Corpus Christi, Texas || 3–1 || Mazur (2–0) || Llewllyn (0–1) || Nedved (2) || – || 4–0 || –
|- align="center" bgcolor="#ffcccc"
| 5 || February 26 || at Texas A&M–Corpus Christi || Whataburger Field • Corpus Christi, Texas || 1–2 || Bird (1–0) || Davitt (0–1) || None || 631 || 4–1 || –
|- align="center" bgcolor="#ffcccc"
| 6 || February 27 || vs  || Whataburger Field • Corpus Christi, Texas || 7–8 || McDonough (1–1) || Brecht (1–1) || Holden (1) || – || 4–2 || –
|-

|- align="center" bgcolor="#ffcccc"
| 7 || March 1 ||  || Duane Banks Field • Iowa City, Iowa || 1–3 || Pasco (1–0) || Simpson (0–1) || Peters (1) || 677 || 4–3 || –
|- align="center" bgcolor="#ccffcc"
| 8 || March 2 ||  || Duane Banks Field • Iowa City, Iowa || 8–0 || Davitt (1–1) || Miller (0–1) || None || 538 || 5–3 || –
|- align="center" bgcolor="#ffcccc"
| 9 || March 4 || vs Wichita State || Riders Field • Frisco, Texas || 4–6 || Bye (1–0) || Christophers (0–1) || Holden (3) || 5,672 || 5–4 || –
|- align="center" bgcolor="#ffcccc"
| 10 || March 5 || vs Texas A&M || Riders Field • Frisco, Texas || 3–7 || Palisch (1–1) || Brecht (1–2) || None || 7,712 || 5–5 || –
|- align="center" bgcolor="#ccffcc"
| 11 || March 6 ||  || Riders Field • Frisco, Texas || 6–5 || Langenberg (2–0) || Hoeft (1–2) || Day (1) || – || 6–5 || –
|- align="center" bgcolor="#dddddd"
| 12 || March 9 || St. Thomas || Duane Banks Field • Iowa City, Iowa ||colspan=12| Game cancelled 
|- align="center" bgcolor="#ffcccc"
| 13 || March 11 || at  || Anteater Ballpark • Irvine, California || 6–7 || Antone (1–0) || Christophers (0–2) || Taylor (2) || 576 || 6–6 || –
|- align="center" bgcolor="#ffcccc"
| 14 || March 12 || at UC Irvine || Anteater Ballpark • Irvine, California || 1–2 || Ingebritson (2–0) || Nedved (0–1) || None || 804 || 6–7 || –
|- align="center" bgcolor="#ccffcc"
| 15 || March 13 || at UC Irvine || Anteater Ballpark • Irvine, California || 12–10 || Langenberg (3–0) || Suarez (0–1) || Llewellyn (1) || 647 || 7–7 || –
|- align="center" bgcolor="#ccffcc"
| 16 || March 15 || at  || Tony Gwynn Stadium • San Diego, California || 6–4 || Davitt (2-1) || Carrigg (0-1) || Day (2) || 344 || 8–7 || –
|- align="center" bgcolor="#dddddd"
| 17 || March 18 || No. 17 Texas Tech || Duane Banks Field • Iowa City, Iowa ||colspan=12| Game cancelled 
|- align="center" bgcolor="#ffcccc"
| 18 || March 19 || No. 17 Texas Tech || Duane Banks Field • Iowa City, Iowa || 3–11 || Birdsell (3–1) || Mazur (2–1) || None || 1,043 || 8–8 || –
|- align="center" bgcolor="#ccffcc"
| 19 || March 20 || No. 17 Texas Tech || Duane Banks Field • Iowa City, Iowa || 6–3 || Nedved (1–1) || Molina (1–2) || None || 1,290 || 9–8 || –
|- align="center" bgcolor="#ccffcc"
| 20 || March 21 || St. Thomas || Duane Banks Field • Iowa City, Iowa || 6–5 || Beutel (1–0) || Dailey (0–1) || Llewellyn (2) || 657 || 10–8 || –
|- align="center" bgcolor="#dddddd"
| 21 || March 23 ||  || Duane Banks Field • Iowa City, Iowa || colspan=12| Game cancelled 
|- align="center" bgcolor='#ccffcc'
| 22 || March 25 || Central Michigan || Duane Banks Field • Iowa City, Iowa || 7–4 || Henderson (1–0) || Insco (0–1) || Llewellyn (3) || 563 || 11–8 || –
|- align="center" bgcolor='#ffcccc'
| 23 || March 26 || Central Michigan || Duane Banks Field • Iowa City, Iowa || 1–10 || Navarra (3–2) || Nedved (1–2) || None || 937 || 11–9 || –
|- align="center" bgcolor='#ccffcc'
| 24 || March 27 || Central Michigan || Duane Banks Field • Iowa City, Iowa || 4–2 || Llewellyn (1–0) || Jones (1–1) || Henderson (1) || 589 || 12–9 || –
|- align="center" bgcolor='#dddddd'
| 25 || March 29 || at  || Duffy Bass Field • Normal, Illinois || colspan=12| Game cancelled 
|-

|- align="center" bgcolor='#ccffcc'
| 26 || April 1 || at Michigan || Ray Fisher Stadium • Ann Arbor, Michigan || 8–2 || Nedved (2–2) || Weston (1–2) || None || 1,200 || 13–9 || 1–0
|- align="center" bgcolor='#ffcccc'
| 27 || April 2 || at Michigan || Ray Fisher Stadium • Ann Arbor, Michigan || 0–2 || O'Halloran (3–2) || Mazur (2–2) || Allen (3) || 1,605 || 13–10 || 1–1
|- align="center" bgcolor="#ccffcc"
| 28 || April 3 || at Michigan || Ray Fisher Stadium • Ann Arbor, Michigan || 10–3 || Langenberg (4–0) || Denner (3–3) || None || 1,008 || 14–10 || 2–1
|- align="center" bgcolor="#ccffcc"
| 29 || April 6 || at  || Dozer Park • Peoria, Illinois || 9–8 || Davitt (3–1) || Campbell (0–2) || None || 304 || 15–10 || 2–1
|- align="center" bgcolor="#ccffcc"
| 30 || April 9 ||  || Duane Banks Field • Iowa City, Iowa || 4–2 || Nedved (3–2) || Kirschsieper (4–2) || Beutel (1) || 1,226 || 16–10 || 3–1
|- align="center" bgcolor="#ffcccc"
| 31 || April 9 || Illinois || Duane Banks Field • Iowa City, Iowa || 5–7 || Glassey (1–0) || DeTaeye (0–1) || None || 1,226 || 16–11 || 3–2
|- align="center" bgcolor="#ffcccc"
| 32 || April 10 || Illinois || Duane Banks Field • Iowa City, Iowa || 5–9 || Green (1–1) || Llewellyn (1–1) || None || 1,084 || 16–12 || 3–3
|- align="center" bgcolor="#ccffcc"
| 33 || April 12 || at  || Franklin Field • Franklin, Wisconsin || 16–2 || Schultz (1–0) || Schulfer (2–1) || None || 455 || 17–12 || 3–3
|- align="center" bgcolor="#ccffcc"
| 34 || April 15 ||  || Duane Banks Field • Iowa City, Iowa || 9–3 || Mazur (3–2) || Ireland (3–3) || None || 946 || 18–12 || 4–3
|- align="center" bgcolor="#ccffcc"
| 35 || April 16 || Minnesota || Duane Banks Field • Iowa City, Iowa || 2–1 || Beutel (2–0) || Massey (2–5) || Davitt (1) || 962 || 19–12 || 5–3
|- align="center" bgcolor="#ccffcc"
| 36 || April 17 || Minnesota || Duane Banks Field • Iowa City, Iowa || 9–3 || Nedved (4–2) || Semb (1–4) || None || 646 || 20–12 || 6–3
|- align="center" bgcolor="#ccffcc"
| 37 || April 19 || Bradley || Duane Banks Field • Iowa City, Iowa || 15–8 || Wheatley (1–0) || Day (1–4) || None || 437 || 21–12 || 6–3
|- align="center" bgcolor="#ccffcc"
| 38 || April 22 || at No. 8  || Bainton Field • Piscataway, New Jersey || 4–1 || Mazur (4–2) || Kollar (6–1) || Nedved (3) || 1,052 || 22–12 || 7–3
|- align="center" bgcolor="#ccffcc"
| 39 || April 23 || at No. 8 Rutgers || Bainton Field • Piscataway, New Jersey || 12–2 || Schultz (2–0) || Florence (4–2) || None || 753 || 23–12 || 8–3
|- align="center" bgcolor="#ffcccc"
| 40 || April 24 || at No. 8 Rutgers || Bainton Field • Piscataway, New Jersey || 4–10 || Bello (4–0) || Langenberg (4–1) || None || 862 || 23–13 || 8–4
|- align="center" bgcolor="#ccffcc"
| 41 || April 26 ||  || Duane Banks Field • Iowa City, Iowa || 11–1 || DeTaeye (1–1) || Greenan (0–3) || None || 662 || 24–13 || 8–4
|- align="center" bgcolor="#ccffcc"
| 42 || April 29 || at Nebraska || Haymarket Park • Lincoln, Nebraska || 1–0 || Mazur (5–2) ||  Schanaman (2–7) || None || 4,835 || 25–13 || 9–4
|-

|- align="center" bgcolor="#ffcccc"
| 43 || May 1 || at Nebraska || Haymarket Park • Lincoln, Nebraska || 1–12 || Olson (2–3) || Schultz (2–1) || None || 5,741 || 25–14 || 9–5
|- align="center" bgcolor="#ccffcc"
| 44 || May 1 || at Nebraska || Haymarket Park • Lincoln, Nebraska || 5–3 || Nedved (5–2) || Bragg (1–5) || Beutel (2) || 5,741 || 26–14 || 10–5
|- align="center" bgcolor="#ffcccc"
| 45 || May 3 || Illinois State || Duane Banks Field • Iowa City, Iowa || 2–3 || Kubiatowicz (3–2) || Brecht (1–3) || Hart (2) || 534 || 26–15 || 10–5
|- align="center" bgcolor="#ccffcc"
| 46 || May 6 || Purdue || Duane Banks Field • Iowa City, Iowa || 5–2 || Mazur (6–2) || Backer (2–1) || Buetel (3) || 826 || 27–15 || 11–5
|- align="center" bgcolor="#ffcccc"
| 47 || May 7 || Purdue || Duane Banks Field • Iowa City, Iowa || 6–10 || Wendell (5–2) || Schultz (2–2) || None || 1,734 || 27–16 || 11–6
|- align="center" bgcolor="#ccffcc"
| 48 || May 8 || Purdue || Duane Banks Field • Iowa City, Iowa || 9–1 || Langenberg (5–1) || Danzeisen (1–1) || None || 1,082 || 28–16 || 12–6
|- align="center" bgcolor="#ccffcc"
| 49 || May 13 || at  || Drayton McLane Baseball Stadium at John H. Kobs Field • East Lansing, Michigan || 5–0 || Mazur (7–2) || Tomasic (3–4) || None || 559 || 29–16 || 13–6
|- align="center" bgcolor="#ccffcc"
| 50 || May 14 || at Michigan State || Drayton McLane Baseball Stadium at John H. Kobs Field • East Lansing, Michigan || 12–2 || Beutel (3–0) || Powers (3–7) || None || 442 || 30–16 || 14–6
|- align="center" bgcolor="#ffcccc"
| 51 || May 15 || at Michigan State || Drayton McLane Baseball Stadium at John H. Kobs Field • East Lansing, Michigan || 8–11 || Cook (1–4) || Langenberg (5–2) || Bischoff (11) || 883 || 30–17 || 14–7
|- align="center" bgcolor='#dddddd'
| 52 || May 17 || at  || Les Miller Field at Curtis Granderson Stadium • Chicago, Illinois || colspan=12| Game cancelled 
|- align="center" bgcolor="#ccffcc"
| 53 || May 19 || Indiana || Duane Banks Field • Iowa City, Iowa || 30–16 || Davitt (4–1) || Hayden (4–1) || None || 1,194 || 31–17 || 15–7
|- align="center" bgcolor="#ccffcc"
| 54 || May 20 || Indiana || Duane Banks Field • Iowa City, Iowa || 12–0 || Nedved (6–2) || Perkins (3–3) || None || 2,019 || 32–17 || 16–7
|- align="center" bgcolor="#ccffcc"
| 55 || May 21 || Indiana || Duane Banks Field • Iowa City, Iowa || 2–1 || Langenberg (5–2) || Brehmer (4–4) || Buetel (4) || 1,224 || 33–17 || 17–7
|-

|-
! style="" | Postseason
|- valign="top" 

|- align="center" bgcolor="#ffcccc"
| 56 || May 26 || vs  || Charles Schwab Field Omaha • Omaha, Nebraska || 2–5 || Shingledeck (7–3) || Mazur (7–3) || Luensmann (2) || – || 33–18 || 17–7
|- align="center" bgcolor="#ccffcc"
| 57 || May 27 || vs Purdue || Charles Schwab Field Omaha • Omaha, Nebraska || 5–4 || Christophersen (1–2) || Weins (3–4) || None || – || 34–18 || 17–7
|- align="center" bgcolor="#ccffcc"
| 58 || May 28 || vs Penn State || Charles Schwab Field Omaha • Omaha, Nebraska || 11–3 || Langenberg (6–2) || Mellott (3–5) || None || – || 35–18 || 17–7
|- align="center" bgcolor="#ccffcc"
| 59 || May 28 || vs Michigan || Charles Schwab Field Omaha • Omaha, Nebraska || 11–3 || Baumann (1–0) || Allen (7–2) || Schultz (1) || – || 36–18 || 17–7
|- align="center" bgcolor="#ffcccc"
| 60 || May 29 || vs Michigan || Charles Schwab Field Omaha • Omaha, Nebraska || 1–13 || O'Halloran (5–4) || Brecht (1–4) || Weston (4) || – || 36–19 || 17–7
|-

Awards

Big Ten Conference Players of the Week

Conference awards

Rankings

References

Iowa
Iowa Hawkeyes baseball seasons
Iowa